Charles F. Passel (April 9, 1915 – December 27, 2002) was a polar scientist responsible along with Paul Siple for the development of the wind chill factor parameter.

Biography
Passel was born in Indianapolis, Indiana on April 9, 1915. He had a bachelor's degree in geology from Miami University (Ohio), and a master's degree from Indiana University.

Passel was a major participant in the  third Antarctic Expedition of Admiral Richard E. Byrd (1939–1941). Passel had several diverse duties on the expedition (as all the expedition members did) including as a dog team driver.
His work with Siple was published in the American Philosophical Society 

He died December 27, 2002, in Abilene, Texas.

Legacy
Passel's diary is published as the book Ice.

See also
 American Polar Society
 Mount Passel
 Warpasgiljo Glacier

Notes

1915 births
2002 deaths
People from Indianapolis
Explorers of Antarctica
Marie Byrd Land explorers and scientists
Miami University alumni
Indiana University alumni
Writers from Indiana